This is a list of years in Canadian television.

Twenty-first century

Twentieth century

See also 
 List of years in Canada
 List of years in television
 List of Canadian films

Television
Television in Canada by year
Canadian television